League tables for teams participating in Kakkonen, the third tier of the Finnish Soccer League system, in 2002.

League Tables 2002

Southern Group, Etelälohko

Eastern Group, Itälohko

Western Group, Länsilohko

Northern Group, Pohjoislohko

Promotion Playoffs

First round

TPV, Tampere – OLS, Oulu 2–3
OLS, Oulu – TPV, Tampere 3–1
FC Espoo – WJK, Varkaus 0–2
WJK, Varkaus – FC Espoo 0–1

Second round

FC Espoo – HIFK, Helsinki 3–3
HIFK, Helsinki – FC Espoo, 2–2
WJK, Varkaus – FC Viikingit, Helsinki 0–3
Viikingit, Helsinki – WJK, Varkaus 3–2
TPV, Tampere – Kraft, Närpes 0–2
Kraft, Närpes – TPV, Tampere 4–0
OLS, Oulu – FC Korsholm, Korsholm 1–2
FC Korsholm, Korsholm – OLS, Oulu 0–6

HIFK, FC Viikingit and Närpes Kraft retain their places in the Ykkönen. OLS are promoted to Ykkönen.

Leading goal scorers

Etelälohko

21 - Joonas Sarelius, FC Espoo
17 - Geoffrey Brown, FJK
15 - Kari Vuorinen, FJK

Itälohko

20 - Babatunde Wusu, Pallohait
17 - Markus Hyttinen, Jippo
14 - Iiro kiukas, MiKi
14 - Sükrü Uzuner, JJK

Länsilohko

16 - Jouni Santanen, KaIK
15 - Harri Mikkola, PS-44
12 - Pasi Heinänen, KaIK
12 - Kari Ketola, FC Rauma

Pohjoislohko

33 - Pasi Nevanperä, FC Kiisto
17 - Kenneth Björgskog, Öja-73
13 - Jari Jäväjä, OLS
13 - Esa Savolainen, PS Kemi
13 - Fredrik Söderman, JBK

Footnotes

References and sources
Finnish FA, Suomen Palloliitto 
Kakkonen - Finnish Wikipedia

Kakkonen seasons
3
Fin
Fin